Aguilar Reorganized School District RE-6 is a public school district in Las Animas County, Colorado, United States, based in Aguilar, Colorado.

Schools
The Aguilar Reorganized School District RE-6 has one elementary school and one junior/senior high school.

Elementary schools
Aguilar Elementary School

Junior/senior high schools
Aguilar Junior/Senior High School

References

External links

School districts in Colorado
Education in Las Animas County, Colorado